The Mary Murphy Mine was the principal gold mine of the Chalk Creek mining district of Chaffee County, Colorado, United States, near St. Elmo, Colorado. The Mary Murphy Mine operated continuously from 1870 to 1925, and produced 220 thousand ounces of gold, worth $4.4 million then (or about $180,000,000 in 2008), plus considerable silver, lead, and zinc. There were two aerial tramways connecting the mine to Romley, Colorado, and the Denver, South Park and Pacific Railroad.

In 1984 the Historic American Engineering Record recorded the structures then standing in the area.

Drainage from the old mine into Chalk Creek, a tributary of the Upper Arkansas River, would sometimes cause fish kills at Chalk Cliffs Rearing Unit, the state-run fish hatchery downstream, such as the kill of 800,000 fingerling trout in 1986. The Colorado Division of Minerals and Geology consolidated all of the surface wastes and capped them in a “high-and-dry” spot on the mill site. This reduced the dissolved metals levels enough to keep the fish kills from recurring. Since then, the site has been used as test-bed for new ways to treat harmful drainage from abandoned mines in the Colorado Rockies.

The Mary Murphy Mine is a popular destination for four-wheelers and ghost-town enthusiasts.

References

External links
Mary Murphy Mine photo gallery
Mary Murphy Mine visitor info
Historic American Engineering Record (HAER) documentation, filed under Iron City (historical), Chaffee County, CO:

Buildings and structures in Chaffee County, Colorado
Colorado Mining Boom
Former populated places in Chaffee County, Colorado
Ghost towns in Colorado
Gold mines in Colorado
Historic American Engineering Record in Colorado